Félix de Bedout Molina is a Colombian-French journalist, born 24 June 1964 in Medellín. He has worked in Noticiero Nacional, NTC Noticias, Félix Noche, Reportaje al Misterio and Historia Secreta of History Latin America. In 2011 De Bedout became part of morning radio show La W of W Radio. On July 18, 2011 he joined Univision's Despierta America in Miami, FL. On January 10, 2012 De Bedout left Despierta America to become the news anchor of Noticiero Univision Fin de Semana.

References

External links 
 Profile in Colombialink

1964 births
Colombian people of French descent
Living people
Colombian television journalists
People from Medellín